Ernest James Gaines (January 15, 1933 – November 5, 2019) was an American author whose works have been taught in college classrooms and translated into many languages, including French, Spanish, German, Russian and Chinese. Four of his works were made into television movies.

His 1993 novel, A Lesson Before Dying, won the National Book Critics Circle Award for fiction. Gaines was a MacArthur Foundation fellow, was awarded the National Humanities Medal, and was inducted into the French Ordre des Arts et des Lettres (Order of Arts and Letters) as a Chevalier.

Biography
Gaines was among the fifth generation of his sharecropper family to be born on a plantation in Pointe Coupee Parish, Louisiana. That became the setting and premise for many of his later works. He was the eldest of 12 children, raised by his aunt, who was disabled and had to crawl to get around the house. Although born generations after the end of slavery, Gaines grew up impoverished, living in old slave quarters on a plantation.

Gaines' first years of school took place in the plantation church. When the children were not picking cotton in the fields, a visiting teacher came for five to six months of the year to provide basic education. Gaines then spent three years at St. Augustine School, a Catholic school for African Americans in New Roads, Louisiana. Schooling for African-American children did not continue beyond the eighth grade during this time in Pointe Coupee Parish.

When he was 15 years old, Gaines moved to Vallejo, California, to join his mother and stepfather, who had left Louisiana during World War II. His first novel was written at the age of 17, while Gaines was babysitting his youngest brother, Michael. According to one account, he wrapped it in brown paper, tied it with string, and sent it to a New York publisher, who rejected it. Gaines burned the manuscript, but later rewrote it to become his first published novel, Catherine Carmier.

In 1956, Gaines published his first short story, The Turtles, in a college magazine at San Francisco State University (SFSU). The next year he earned a degree in literature from SFSU. After spending two years in the Army, he won a writing fellowship to Stanford University.

From 1981 until retiring in 2004, Gaines was a Writer-in-Residence at the University of Louisiana at Lafayette.  In 1996, Gaines spent a full semester as a visiting professor at the University of Rennes in France, where he taught the first creative writing class ever offered in the French university system.

In the final years of his life, Gaines lived on Louisiana Highway 1 in Oscar, Louisiana, where he and his wife built a home on part of the old plantation where he grew up. He had the building where he attended church and school moved to his property.

Gaines died from natural causes at his home on November 5, 2019. He was 86 years old.

Bibliography
Books
Catherine Carmier (1964)
Of Love and Dust (1967)
Bloodline (1968)
The Autobiography of Miss Jane Pittman (1971)
A Long Day in November (1971)
In My Father's House (1978)
A Gathering of Old Men (1983)
A Lesson Before Dying (1993) – nominated for Pulitzer Prize, National Book Critics Circle Award for fiction (1993); Oprah's Book Club (1997)
Mozart and Leadbelly: Stories and Essays (2005)
The Tragedy of Brady Sims (2017)

Short stories
"The Turtles" (1956)
"Boy in the Double-Breasted Suit" (1957)
"Mary Louise" (1960)
"Just Like a Tree" (1963)
"The Sky Is Gray" (1963)
"A Long Day in November" (1964)
"My Grandpa and the Haint" (1966)
"Christ Walked Down Market Street" (1984 - publish 2004) 

Filmography
The Autobiography of Miss Jane Pittman, CBS Television (1974) – Directors Guild of America Award, eight Emmy Awards, nominated for a BAFTA award
The Sky Is Gray, American Short Story Series, PBS (1980)
A Gathering of Old Men, CBS Television (1987)
A Lesson Before Dying, HBO (1999); winner, Emmy Award for Outstanding Made For Television Movie

Awards
 National Medal of Arts 2012
 Sidney Lanier Prize for Southern Literature (2012)
 American Academy of Achievement's Golden Plate Award (2001)
 The F. Scott Fitzgerald Award for Achievement in American Literature award that is given annually in Rockville, Maryland, the city where Fitzgerald, his wife, and his daughter are buried as part of the F. Scott Fitzgerald Literary Festival (2001). 
 Chevalier (Knight) of the Order of Art and Letters (France) (2000)
 American Academy of Arts and Letters Department of Literature (2000)
 The Governor's Arts Award (2000)
 The Louisiana Writer Award (2000)
 National Humanities Medal (2000)
 National Book Critics Circle Award for Fiction (1993)
 John D. and Catherine T. MacArthur Foundation Fellow (1993)
 Dos Passos Prize (1993)
Honorary Doctor of Humane Letters (L.H.D.) degree from Whittier College (1986)
 Solomon R. Guggenheim Foundation Fellow (1971)
 National Endowment for the Arts grant (1967)
 Wallace Stegner Fellow (1957)
 Subject of a 2023 USPS Forever stamp from the Black Heritage series

Ernest J. Gaines Award for Literary Excellence
A book award established by donors of the Baton Rouge Area Foundation in 2007 to honor Gaines' legacy and encourage rising African-American fiction writers. The winner is selected by a panel of five judges who are well known in the literary world. The winner receives a US$10,000 award and a commemorative sculpture created by Louisiana artist Robert Moreland.

See also
 Membership discrimination in California social clubs

References

Sources
The African American Registry

External links

The Ernest J. Gaines Center at the University of Louisiana at Lafayette
Teaching Materials for Works by Ernest J. Gaines
Samples of Gaines' writing
Interview with Gaines
Article about Gaines: "Going Home"
Interview with Gaines: "Going Home: the transcript"
Ernest J. Gaines Award
 Kelly, Evelyn E., Ph.D., "'Pray if You Want To:' A Reevaluation of Religion in the Fiction of Ernest J. Gaines" (2010)
Quotes source
Interview with Ernest Gaines for OxMag
 Interview with Ernest J. Gaines, at Religion & Ethics Newsweekly, February 18, 2011
 Christ Walked Down Market Street JSTOR archive of autumn 2004 Calloo Magazine V28, Johns Hopkins University

1933 births
2019 deaths
20th-century American novelists
21st-century American novelists
African-American novelists
American male novelists
Chevaliers of the Ordre des Arts et des Lettres
MacArthur Fellows
Members of the American Academy of Arts and Letters
People from Pointe Coupee Parish, Louisiana
Military personnel from Louisiana
San Francisco State University alumni
Stanford University alumni
University of Louisiana at Lafayette faculty
Academic staff of Rennes 2 University
Novelists from Louisiana
National Humanities Medal recipients
Postmodern writers
United States National Medal of Arts recipients
African-American short story writers
American male short story writers
20th-century American short story writers
21st-century American short story writers
Writers of American Southern literature
20th-century American male writers
21st-century American male writers
Writers from Vallejo, California
Stegner Fellows
20th-century African-American writers
21st-century African-American writers
African-American male writers